Layla Demay, also known as Layla Law-Gisiko (born 26 June 1971) is a French-American journalist, author, documentary film director and politician. She is the co-author with Laure Watrin of the books series Les Pintades. She is the co-host of the TV series Les Pintades, aired as part of the TV show Les Nouveaux Explorateurs, broadcast on Canal Plus. She is running as a democrat for New York State Assembly in District 75 (Chelsea, Hell's Kitchen, Columbus Circle, portions of Midtown and the Upper West Side).

Biography 
Layla Demay was born in Paris in 1971. She received a master's degree in French literature from La Sorbonne University in Paris, as well as a master's degree in Journalism and Communication from Institut Français de Presse in Paris.

She started her career in France as a journalist and producer for CAPA French TV Press Agency, before joining the TF1 newsroom.

In 1997, she moved to New York, where she became a correspondent for various French media outlets, including flagship news program Envoyé spécial on French state channel France 2. From 1997 to 2002, she covered current affairs with in-depth stories on topics ranging from women in the Ku Klux Klan, teen pregnancy, fundamentalist Mormon polygamist sects in Utah, Amish sects in Pennsylvania or the rise of SWAT teams in the US.

In 2000, she was a guest speaker at the Shadow Convention in Philadelphia, where her documentary War Zone was featured.

She is a guest contributor for French and European TV channels, as well as the Huffington Post and Slate.fr.

Between 2007 and 2009, Layla Demay CoSigne with Laure Watrin Three documentaries Les guinea pigs as part of the program Le Club des Nouveaux Explorers,  the thematic travel documentary series broadcast on Canal+ and presented by Maïtena Biraben, then by Diego Buñuel.

On December 16, 2021, Law-Gisiko announced her candidacy to succeed Richard Gottfried as the New York State Assembly member for the 75th Assembly District who announced his retirement from the Assembly on December 13, 2021.

Bibliography 

Pintades in New York  (Les Pintades à New York)
New York for Pintades  (Le New York des Pintades)
Pintades in London  (Les Pintades à Londres)
Pintades in Teheran  (Les Pintades à Téhéran)
Pintades in Paris  (Une vie de Pintade à Paris)
Pintades in Beyrouth  (Une vie de Pintade à Beyrouth)
Pintades cook book  (Les Pintades passent à la casserole)
Pintade in Berlin  (Une vie de Pintade à Berlin)
Pintades in Madrid  (Une vie de Pintade à Madrid)
Pintades in Moscow (Une vie de Pintade à Moscou)

Filmography 

Pintades in London (Les Pintades à Londres), presented by Maïtena Biraben for the TV show Les Nouveaux Explorateurs. Directed by Stéphane Carrel, authors/hosts Layla Demay and Laure Watrin. Producer: Capa TV[8]. Length: 28'50. Date: 2007.
Pintades in Rio (Les Pintades à Rio), presented by Maïtena Biraben for the TV show Les Nouveaux Explorateurs. Directed by Stéphane Carrel, authors/hosts Layla Demay and Laure Watrin. Producer: CapaTV[10]. Length: 53'31. Date: 2008.
Pintades in New York (Les Pintades à New York), presented by Diego Buñuel for the TV show Les Nouveaux Explorateurs.Directed by Jean-Marie Barrère, authors/hosts Layla Demay and Laure Watrin. Producer: CapaTV[12]. Length: 51'49. Date: 2008.

References

1971 births
Living people
University of Paris alumni
French women writers
French journalists